KVWO-LP (94.7 FM) was a low-power FM radio station licensed to Welch, Oklahoma, United States. The station was owned by Voice of Welch Communications, Inc.

History
The callsign KVWO-LP was issued on May 13, 2014. Voice of Welch Communications surrendered the station's license to the Federal Communications Commission on August 4, 2022, and it was cancelled the same day.

References

External links

VWO-LP
VWO-LP
Radio stations established in 2017
Radio stations disestablished in 2022
2017 establishments in Oklahoma
2022 disestablishments in Oklahoma
Defunct radio stations in the United States
VWO-LP